Antarctica: The Bliss Out, Vol. 2 is the third studio album by American musical duo Windy & Carl. It was released in February 1997 by Darla Records as the second entry in the label's Bliss Out series of ambient records.

The artwork for the album was designed by Seth Robson.

Critical reception

In 2016, Pitchfork ranked Antarctica: The Bliss Out, Vol. 2 at number 39 on its list of the 50 best shoegaze albums of all time.

Track listing

References

External links
 

1997 albums
Windy & Carl albums
Darla Records albums